The spotless catshark (Bythaelurus immaculatus) is a catshark of the family Scyliorhinidae found in the South China Sea at depths between 535 and 1,020 m on the continental slope.

References

 

spotless catshark
Fish of China
South China Sea
spotless catshark